Natalya Vladimirovna Kostina (born Natalya Bezrukikh, 27 April 1995) is a Russian rugby player. She was a member of the Russia national women's rugby sevens team. She was 2014 European Rugby Sevens Champion. She was awarded the Master of Sports of Russia, in 2016.

Biography 
She joined the Russian rugby sevens team in 2014, and competed at the 2014 Rugby Europe Sevens Grand Prix Series. 

In 2016, she also participated in the 2016 Rugby Europe Women's Sevens Grand Prix Series in Spain, where Russia took 3rd place. 

In 2018, she won the 2018 Russian Cup. In 2019, she was nominated for the best player of Krasny Yar rugby club.

She is also involved in beach rugby, and participated in the training camp before the 2019 European Championship.
In 2020, she competed in the European Women's Rugby World Cup qualification.

References 

1995 births
Russian rugby sevens players
Living people